Walk with Me may refer to:

Music 
 Walk with Me (Jamelia album), 2006
 Walk with Me (Monika Linkytė album), 2015
 Walk with Me (Bugzy Malone EP), 2015
 Walk with Me (Rotimi EP), 2019
 "Walk with Me" (song), a 2019 song by Måns Zelmerlöw and Dotter
 "Walk with Me", a 1966 song by The Seekers
 "Walk with Me", a 2002 song by Seven and the Sun
 "Walk with Me", a 2003 song by Joe Budden, from the album Joe Budden
 "Walk with Me", a 2010 song by Neil Young, from the album Le Noise

Film, television, and video games 
 Walk with Me (2016 film), a Danish film
 Walk with Me (2017 film), a documentary about Thích Nhất Hạnh
 Walk with Me (2019 film), a Malaysian-Hong Kong horror film
 "Walk with Me" (The Walking Dead), a television episode
 Walk with Me! or Personal Trainer: Walking, a 2008 Nintendo DS exergaming application
 Walk with Me (2021 film), an American independent film